The 2008 Svenska Cupen Final took place on 21 September 2008 at Fredriksskans, Kalmar. The match was contested by the then-leaders in Allsvenskan, Kalmar FF, and 4th placed IFK Göteborg. It was two years running that Kalmar and Göteborg met in the cup final and the latter match was played at Fredriksskans.

The 90 minutes plus extra time ended in a goalless draw. After four successive penalties for both teams, Göteborg keeper Kim Christensen saved Marcus Lindberg's penalty. Thereafter Pontus Wernbloom scored and secured the fifth Svenska Cupen title for IFK Göteborg of all time.

Road to the Final

 Square brackets [ ] represent the opposition's division.

Match details

See also
2008 Svenska Cupen

References

External links
Svenska Cupen at svenskfotboll.se

2008
Cupen
Kalmar FF matches
IFK Göteborg matches
Football in Kalmar
September 2008 sports events in Europe
Sports competitions in Kalmar
Association football penalty shoot-outs